Gormenghast is a four-episode television series based on the first two novels of the Gothic fantasy Gormenghast series by Mervyn Peake. It was produced and broadcast by the BBC.

First broadcast in June 2000, the series was designed for an early evening time-slot in much the same vein as the earlier adaptations of The Chronicles of Narnia. The BBC conception was based on the idea that Peake's early life in China had influenced the creation of Gormenghast; thus, the castle in the series resembles the Forbidden City in Beijing as well as the holy city of Lhasa in Tibet.

Plot

The series covers the events of the first two books, Titus Groan and Gormenghast. It does not cover any of the events from the third book, Titus Alone.

Cast

Production
At the time of its broadcast, led by producer, Estelle Daniel, Gormenghast was among the most ambitious serials ever undertaken by the BBC. The series required a combined five years of production and pre-production and utilized over 120 sets.

Differences from source material 
Changes were made to both the plots and characters of both books.

Plot 
Certain changes are made to make the story fit the four-episode format: 
 Steerpike's murder of Barquentine is delayed until the fourth episode, to make room for the sections concerning Titus's escapes, thus making the character significantly older when this happens.
 The story of Keda's lovers' rivalry and Keda's subsequent wanderings in the wilderness are condensed and she leaves Gormenghast much later, just prior to Swelter and Sepulchrave's deaths.
 Steerpike's backstory was amended for the TV series. In Titus Groan he had only been in the kitchen for a few weeks before making his escape, while on TV in a monologue to his monkey in episode 4, Steerpike stated that he was sent to the kitchens when he was six, suffering various abuses at the hands of Swelter. In the DVD documentary The Making of Gormenghast Jonathan Rhys-Myers (who played Steerpike) stated that the character of Steerpike had been subjected to sexual abuse in the kitchens, though this was not made explicit in any of the episodes.
 A section of the plot of Titus Groan in which Fuchsia and Steerpike meet in the woods and discuss equality, and Fuchsia subsequently breaking her leg, is moved forward into the events of Gormenghast, by which point Steerpike is actively trying to seduce Fuchsia.
 In the books, Fuchsia falls out of love instantly with Steerpike when he calls her a fool, but in the series her love endures after he is unmasked. In episode 4, an additional scene is added where Steerpike, now on the run, begs for Fuchsia's help and seems to be on the point of receiving it, but when he calls her "Fuchsia", rather than Lady as he has on all other occasions, the display of affection shocks Fuchsia who calls for the guards. Steerpike leaps from the window, reminding her that he could have given her everything.
 In the books, it is ambiguous whether Nannie Slagg's death is natural from old age or not. In the series, it is clear that Steerpike poisons Nannie Slagg, who has become an obstacle to Steerpike's relationship with Fuchsia.

Characters 

 In the book, Steerpike is described as being less physically attractive, with close-set red eyes and greasy hair, which he does not have in the series.
 Several minor characters were cut out entirely for the screen, most notably Sourdust (Barquentine's father who dies in the fire), Pentecost (the gardener) and some of the professors.
 The Headmaster's name has been changed from Deadyawn to De'Ath.
 The character named Rottcodd, who in the book was in charge of the Hall of the Bright Carvings, becomes in the miniseries captain of the guard; a similar character does appear in the books but goes unnamed.
 The names of some other Professors have been shortened. Professor Mulefire is renamed Professor Mule, Professor Cutflower is renamed Professor Flower.
 Barquentine has two legs and crutches on screen rather than one as in the book because Warren Mitchell couldn't manage with one leg strapped up.

Reception 
The series received wide critical acclaim, with particular praise for its visual design, music, cinematography and the cast's performances. Variety offered an especially glowing review, describing it as an "unforgettable production" and a fascinating drama that defied logic. And specifically, the review noted that it featured "marvelous performances all around", although it singled out Celia Imrie's portrayal of Lady Gertrude for especial praise.

Accolades 
Wins

 The New York Festivals, 2000
 Silver WorldMedal in Television/Mini-Series
 Bronze WorldMedal in Television/Best Costume Design
 British Academy of Film and Television Arts/ BAFTA, 2000
 Best Make-up/Hair Design - Joan Hills, Christine Greenwood
 Visual Effects and Graphic Design - Team
 Royal Television Society Craft & Design Awards 1999/2000
 Production Design: Drama
 Christopher Hobbs - Gormenghast
 Lighting, Photography + Camera: Photography Drama
 Gavin Finney - Gormenghast
 The Ivor Novello Awards, 2000
 Best Original Music for a Television/Radio Broadcast
 Gormenghast, Composed by: Sir Richard Rodney Bennett
 UK Publisher: Novello & Company

Nominations
 British Academy of Film and Television Arts/ BAFTA, 2000
 Best Costume Design - Odile Dicks-Mireaux
 Best Editing Fiction/Entertainment - Paul Tothill
 Original Television Music - Richard Rodney Bennett
 Production Design - Christopher Hobbs
 Royal Television Society Craft & Design Awards 1999/2000
 Costume Design: Drama
 Odile Dicks-Mireaux - Gormenghast
 IBC (International Broadcasting Convention) Le Nombre d'Or, Amsterdam, 2000
 Gormenghast
 Banff Television Festival/Banff Rockie Award, 2001
 Gormenghast

References

External links
 
 Gormenghast at bbc.co.uk 
 Homepage of the serial at PBS.org
 

Gormenghast
2000s British drama television series
2000 British television series debuts
2000 British television series endings
BBC television dramas
2000s British television miniseries
Television shows based on British novels
High fantasy television series
English-language television shows